Jesse Boykins III (born February 20, 1985) is a Jamaican-American singer, songwriter, and record producer from Chicago, Illinois.

Career
Boykins is a world soul artist originally from Jamaica, later relocating to Miami and finally Brooklyn.  His first EP, Dopamine: My Life On My Back EP was released February 14, 2008 and his follow up The Beauty Created LP was released November 25, 2008 through NomaDic MuSic.

His career in music began at the age of nine when he joined his school choir.  He soon began auditioning around Miami and found himself recording with various local Miami artists. In high school Boykins was invited to perform in the Grammy Jazz Ensemble and recorded an album with them.

After high school he was recruited to The New School University in New York City.  At The New School, he perfected his skills as a writer, performer, arranger and producer and as a vocalist.  He also studied with classical trainer Kamal Scott and Universal recording artist Bilal.

In November 2017, Boykins revealed that he was signed to Def Jam Recordings. His first album under his major label deal was a physical release of his mixtape Bartholomew, which was previously released for streaming on SoundCloud in 2016. Jesse received his first Grammy nomination for co-writing Steve Lacy's lead single Playground from his ApolloXXI album.

Discography

Studio albums 
 The Beauty Created (2008)
 Zulu Guru (2012)
 Love Apparatus (2014)
 Bartholomew (2017)

Extended plays 
 Dopamine: My Life on My Back (2008)
 Way of a Wayfarer (2011)

Writing credits 

Apollo XXI: Playground - Steve Lacy

Guest appearances

References

External links
 Youtube.com/jboykins3

1985 births
Songwriters from Illinois
Singers from Chicago
Living people
21st-century African-American male singers
The New School alumni
American contemporary R&B singers
American neo soul singers
African-American songwriters
American male songwriters